Zaatar w Zeit, a commercial brand of the Lebanese company Breakfast & Co. S.A.L., is an urban eatery franchise founded in Lebanon in 1999 and operating with 23 outlets in Lebanon and more than 70 outlets throughout the Middle East, including 20 in the United Arab Emirates. The company also has outlets in Jordan, Kuwait, Qatar, Saudi Arabia and Canada and most recently, Egypt.

The name Zaatar W Zeit (stylized as zaatar w zeit) refers to thyme or za'atar in Arabic, a common Middle Eastern herb in Levantine Arabic cuisine used notably in preparation of za'atar manakish and other recipes, and zeit (Arabic for olive oil in this context). The franchise has introduced a far more varied menu than just zaatar-based products.

Company

History and expansion 
Zaatar w Zeit restaurant started as a self-operating business in Lebanon and has expanded through more branches in Lebanon and with franchisees abroad. Headquartered in Jeita, Zouk Mosbeh, Lebanon, it is one of Lebanon's largest restaurant chains. The central kitchen and warehouses are also in Jeita, Zouk Mosbeh. The company began back in 1999 selling Lebanese dough food such as manakish. They also have international operations in a number of countries in the Middle East.

On 6 August 2022, company has started their partnership with Xclusive Yachts.

United Arab Emirates and Saudi Arabia 
Food conglomerate Cravia has operated franchises in the United Arab Emirates since June 2005 and, in partnership with Health Food Company, in the KSA since 2013. A number of outlets in the UAE are open 24/7.  A discount is offered to government employees with the Esaad card. In some areas of Dubai, electric motorbikes have been trialed since late 2018 in an attempt to increase operational sustainability. 

"Zaatar w Zeit" was the first Lebanese restaurant chain to be certified with the ISO 22000:2005  in April 2008.

The company has made donations to various charities.

Logo
In 2011, Pearl Fisher created a new visual identity for Lebanese food retail chain, aiming for a "bolder contemporary look and feel". Jonathan Ford, the Creative Partner in Pearl Fisher, said, "The new logo is a distinctive, modern marque that provides a more literal and graphic expression by creating a simple link between the thyme and the oil, the leaf and the droplet, and forms a distinctive "Z" within the negative space."

References

External links
Official website

1999 establishments in Lebanon
Restaurants established in 1999
Restaurant chains in Lebanon
Restaurant franchises
Lebanese brands